This is the complete list of women's Olympic medalists in fencing.

Current Program

Foil, Individual

Foil, Team

Épée, Individual

Épée, Team

Sabre, Individual

Sabre, Team

All-time medal table - Women's - 1924–2016

References
International Olympic Committee results database

Fencing (women)
medalists
Olympic, women
Fencing